is a Japanese composer and sound programmer. He is often regarded as one of the most influential innovators in chiptune and video game music, producing music in a number of genres including rock, jazz, symphonic, and various electronic genres such as house, electro, techno, trance, and hip hop.

Koshiro and his sister Ayano founded the game development company Ancient in 1990, of which he remains the president. He has been cited as creating some of the most memorable game music of the 1980s and 1990s contributing for games such as Nihon Falcom's Dragon Slayer and Ys series, as well as Sega's The Revenge of Shinobi and Streets of Rage series. The soundtracks for the latter have been cited by some to be ahead of their time.

Biography

Early life
Koshiro was born in Tokyo on December 12, 1967. His mother, Tomo Koshiro, was a pianist. She taught him how to play the piano at the age of three, and by the age of five, he had a strong command of it. In 1975, he began taking music lessons from Joe Hisaishi and studied with him for three years. Everything Koshiro has learned after that has since been self-taught.

While he was still in high school during the early 1980s, Koshiro began composing music on the NEC PC-8801 as a hobby, including mockups of early arcade game music from Namco, Konami, and Sega. The sequencing skills and experience he gained from this would later be utilized in his early video game projects. The video games that influenced him most were The Tower of Druaga (1984), Space Harrier (1985), and Gradius (1985). The video game music soundtracks to these games inspired him to become a video game composer.

In a 1992 interview, Koshiro said that his favorite music genres are new wave, dance music, technopop, classical, and hard rock, and that his favorite Western bands are Van Halen and Soul II Soul.

Nihon Falcom (1986–1988)
Koshiro's first composing job was with Nihon Falcom in 1986 at the age of 18. Falcom used compositions from the PC-8801 demo tape he had sent them in their Dragon Slayer action role-playing game Xanadu Scenario II, for its opening theme and several dungeon levels. He also wrote the opening song in Romancia that same year. His compositions for these early games were influenced by arcade game music and Japanese bands such as The Alfee. He then produced the soundtrack to Dragon Slayer IV / Legacy of the Wizard (1987), which was influenced by the sounds of early Konami games. His most well-known Falcom works are his soundtracks for Sorcerian (1987) and the early Ys games, Ys I (1987) and Ys II (1988). These early music productions mainly featured rock and fusion music. The TurboGrafx-CD versions of the first three Ys games (from 1989 to 1991) are notable for their very early use of Red Book audio in video games. Music from the Ys games were also employed in the Ys anime.

All of these early soundtracks were produced using the FM synthesis sound chip of the PC-8801. Despite later advances in audio technology, Koshiro would continue to use older PC-8801 hardware to produce many of his later video game soundtracks, including the Streets of Rage and Etrian Odyssey soundtracks.<ref name="hg101_retro"> Reprinted from {{citation|title=Retro Gamer|issue=67|year=2009}}</ref> His soundtracks for early Nihon Falcom games, such as the Dragon Slayer and Ys series, are widely regarded as some of the most influential role-playing video game scores.

Early freelance work (1988–1990)
Following his separation with Falcom, Koshiro became a freelancer, composing music for many other companies. His early freelance projects included the Sharp X68000 port of Bosconian, Bothtec's action role-playing game The Scheme (1988) for the PC-8801, and Enix's visual novel adventure game Misty Blue for the PC-9801 in 1990. The latter two soundtracks featured early Eurobeat music. His most notable freelance work was for Sega, where he composed music for the Shinobi series and the Streets of Rage series, as well as Quintet, where he composed the soundtracks to ActRaiser (1990) and ActRaiser 2 (1993).

His first freelance work for Sega was the soundtrack to The Revenge of Shinobi (1989), for which he produced house and "progressive, catchy, techno-style compositions" that fused electronic dance music with traditional Japanese music. His soundtrack for ActRaiser (1990), on the other hand, was mainly classical and orchestral. While working on ActRaiser, in order to get around the SNES's 64 KB memory limitation which limited the number of instruments that can be used and prevented the reloading of samples, Koshiro developed a sample loading system that worked with the ROM cartridge memory,  swapping samples from the ROM data on the fly. This allowed him to "load parts of the music gradually as needed, and also change it quickly between stages or parts of a stage" which the "original system couldn't do it with its restrictions." A similar system was used by other companies for later SNES games such as Squaresoft's Seiken Densetsu 3 (1995) and Namco Tales Studio's Tales of Phantasia (1995).

Founding of Ancient Corp. (1990–1994)
In 1990, Koshiro helped found Ancient Corp., which contributed to the development of a number of games, such as the 8-bit version of Sonic the Hedgehog and Beyond Oasis. The company was also founded by his mother, Tomo Koshiro, while his sister Ayano Koshiro works at the company as an art/character/graphic designer and was also the art designer for the ActRaiser games. His sister Ayano has designed characters and graphics for several games Koshiro has worked on, including the Streets of Rage (Bare Knuckle in Japan) series, Ys, and ActRaiser.

While working with Ancient, he composed the soundtrack for the 8-bit version of Sonic the Hedgehog in 1991. He adapted several pieces of music from the original 16-bit version, while the rest of the soundtrack consisted of his own original music.

His soundtracks for the Streets of Rage series (known as Bare Knuckle in Japan) from 1991 to 1994 were composed using then outdated PC-8801 hardware alongside his own original audio programming language. According to Koshiro: "For Bare Knuckle I used the PC88 and an original programming language I developed myself. The original was called MML, Music Macro Language. It is based on NEC's BASIC program, but I modified it heavily. It was more a BASIC-style language at first, but I modified it to be something more like Assembly. I called it ‘Music Love'. I used it for all the Bare Knuckle games."

The soundtracks for Streets of Rage (1991) and Streets of Rage 2 (1992) were influenced by house, techno, hardcore techno, breakbeat, funk and ethnic music. He also attempted to reproduce the Roland TR-808 and TR-909 beats and Roland TB-303 synths using FM synthesis. The soundtrack for Streets of Rage 2 in particular is considered "revolutionary" and ahead of its time, for its "amazing blend of swaggering house synths, dirty" electro-funk and "trancey electronic textures that would feel as comfortable in a nightclub as a video game."

His CD soundtracks became best-sellers in Japan during the early 1990s. In 1993, Electronic Games listed the first two Streets of Rage games as having some of the best video game music soundtracks they "ever heard." They described Koshiro as "just about universally acknowledged as the most gifted composer currently working in the video game field."

For the soundtrack to Streets of Rage 3 (1994), he created a new composition method called the "Automated Composing System" to produce "fast-beat techno like jungle." It was the most advanced techno technique of the time, incorporating heavily randomized sequences. This resulted in innovative and experimental sounds generated automatically that, according to Koshiro, "you ordinarily never could imagine on your own." This method was very rare at the time, but has since become popular among techno and trance music producers to get "unexpected and odd sounds." The soundtrack also had elements of abstract, experimental, gabber, and trance music. The experimental electronic music was not very well received upon release, but has since been considered to be ahead of its time. According to Mean Machines, "ironically it pre-dated the 'trance' era that came a short while after release."

Koshiro was one of the first composers credited under his real name in a time when several other Japanese developers were credited under pen names.

Later career (1994–present)
Also in 1994, Koshiro co-composed a well known soundtrack for the Mega-CD version of Eye of the Beholder, a dungeon crawl role-playing video game ported over from the original by Japanese developer Opera House and published by Sega. That same year, his soundtrack for Beyond Oasis utilized a late romantic style of music, which he later also utilized for Legend of Oasis (1996), Merregnon (2000), and Warriors of the Lost Empire (2007).

He also composed the soundtrack for Sega's Shenmue (1999) alongside Takenobu Mitsuyoshi and a few others, with Koshiro contributing fifteen original compositions to the soundtrack. Three other staff members of Ancient also worked on Shenmue. He later composed the soundtracks for the Wangan Midnight series (2001 onwards) and Namco × Capcom (2005). These were the first projects where he wrote the lyrics along with the music. For the Wangan Midnight series in particular, his compositions were mostly trance music, a style he was previously unfamiliar with.

He composed the main theme of the French TV channel Nolife, which launched in 2007. The theme was released as part of the album Tamiuta in 2008. Some of Koshiro's latest work includes music for the Etrian Odyssey series, the Wangan Midnight series, and the 7th Dragon series. In 2018, Koshiro contributed one song to Nobuhiko Okamoto's album Braverthday. He was brought back to compose for Streets of Rage 4 in 2020, along with Kawashima and several others. In the same year, he composed the theme song "Koroneraiser Inu-More!" for Hololive's virtual YouTuber Korone Inugami.

WorksAll works listed below were composed solely by Koshiro unless otherwise noted''

Footnotes

Notes

References

External links
 Ancient Corp. website 
 

1967 births
Anime composers
Electronic composers
Japanese composers
Japanese dance musicians
Japanese electronic musicians
Japanese male composers
Japanese music arrangers
Japanese techno musicians
Japanese trance musicians
Living people
Musicians from Western Tokyo
People from Hino, Tokyo
Video game composers